Rubén Darío Paredes del Río (born 11 August 1933) is a Panamanian army officer who was the military ruler of Panama from 1982 to 1983.

Colonel Paredes came to power after the displacement of Colonel Florencio Flores, due to the instability of Panamanian National Guard after the death of Omar Torrijos. He was educated at the military academy in Nicaragua. Paredes' tenure as National Guard commander was from March 1982 to August 1983. Paredes was promoted to the rank of general on March 3. In August 1983, Paredes resigned over a dispute concerning the government's attitude towards the United States involvement in Nicaragua. He retired from the Panamanian National Guard after making a deal with Manuel Noriega that would make Paredes president. However, after his resignation, Noriega reneged on the deal and had him arrested. He ran unsuccessfully as president in the 1984 election as a candidate.

Paredes is retired and lives in Panama City, Panama. His uncle, Rigoberto Paredes, was a member of the National Assembly in the 1980s and was alleged to be one of Noriega's closest allies. Rigoberto hosted a talk radio show on Radio BB in Panama City. Rigoberto Paredes died in 2007.

References

1933 births
Living people
People from Panama City
Panamanian people of Spanish descent
Panamanian military commanders